Promi Big Brother 2018, also known as Promi Big Brother 6 was the sixth season of the German reality television series Promi Big Brother. The show began airing on 17 August 2018 on Sat.1 and ended after 17 days on 31 August 2018. It was the sixth season of the Big Brother in total to air on Sat.1 to date. Jochen Schropp returned as host of the show and with new host Marlene Lufen.

Silvia Wollny was announced as the winner of the season, with Chethrin Schulze as the runner-up.

Format 
Promis had participated in tasks and matches for treats or to avoid punishments. Daily nominations also took place. Furthermore, the house consists of two areas, the luxurious - "Villa" and the poor - "Construction Site". Housemates in "Villa" will choose from the "Construction Site" housemates to join them, whilst the public will vote one of them move to the "Construction Site".

House
This year's Promi Big Brother contains two areas: the luxurious area - the Villa and the poor area - the Construction Site. The Villa having a living area, bathroom, bedroom and diary room as usual. The Construction Site is meager with no bathroom and no beds. There is only a camping toilet, fireplace, cold water tap and a construction trailer.

Housemates

Distribution of housemates
As in the last four seasons, the participants were distributed before the broadcast of the show by the producers in the respective areas. From the first show, the participants and the audience could change the distribution of the housemates in each case by voting and use the Duel Arena. Nine housemates entered The Construction Site area two days before the show was broadcast. The remaining three housemates moved in during the first episode.

Duel Arena
As in the previous year, this year live duels took place in the "Outdoor Duel Arena" again. Big Brother each appoint one or two housemates from the "area" who must compete at the Duel Arena. In the Duel Arena, they both played a game and the loser must face the consequences for his living area. A draw always wins for the inhabitants in "The Villa". The duels each can either have a positive impact on the winner's section or consequences for the loser's section. For example, the losing team changing their areas, receives less food or have to give personal items.

Nominations table

Notes

: Housemates in "The Construction Site" were rewarded immunities for winning the duel by Daniel and Johannes.
: Male housemates were immune, and only female housemates could be nominated.
: Alphonso won the duel, he's nomination counted double.
: Daniel was immune that nomination after winning the Duel while Chethrin was automatically nominated after losing it. Both had the opportunity to give both options to another housemate but they decided to keep it for themselves.
: Daniel was immune after receiving the final ticket.

Ratings

References

External links 
Official Homepage

2018 German television seasons
06